is the lead vocalist of the pop group Globe. Since 2001, she has had a solo career, starting with the single "A Song Is Born" in collaboration with Ayumi Hamasaki. In late 2003, she released her first solo EP called KCO. Keiko, under the name KCO, released her first solo album O-Crazy Luv on Universal in 2008. The album contains a total of 11 tracks, including her first single under the new name, "Haru no Yuki" (Spring Snow).

Personal life
She was born in Usuki, Japan.  In November 2002, she married fellow Globe member Tetsuya Komuro.

On October 24, 2011, Keiko was hospitalized and diagnosed with a subarachnoid haemorrhage. She subsequently underwent a five-hour surgery to repair the condition. As of December 2017, she is currently in rehabilitation therapy, but the prognosis seems to be good.

In October 2019, it was reported that Keiko and Tetsuya Komuro were in the process of divorce mediation after revelations a year earlier of an affair with a nurse who was taking care of Keiko during her recovery from surgery. It was also reported that the revelation of this affair also prompted TK's precipitous retirement from the music industry. At present, the couple is said to be separated.

In February 26, 2021, it was announced that a divorce was established with Komuro.

Discography

as Keiko 
 "On the Way to YOU"(2000) (#5 in Japan)
 "A Song Is Born" (with Ayumi Hamasaki, 2001) (#1 in Japan)
 "Be True" (with Cyber X) (2003) (#18 in Japan)
 KCO (2003) (#8 in Japan)

as KCO 
 "Haru no Yuki" (春の雪, March 12, 2008)
 O-Crazy Luv (April 30, 2008)
"Mystic Fawn"

Notes

External links 
 
 Universal Music profile
 Official blog
 Official Twitter
 

1972 births
Avex Group artists
Japanese women pop singers
Japanese synth-pop singers
Japanese trance musicians
Living people
Musicians from Ōita Prefecture
People from Usuki, Ōita
Universal Music Japan artists
Globe (band) members
21st-century Japanese singers
21st-century Japanese women singers
Japanese women in electronic music